Scar Creek Airport  was a small general aviation airport located near Scar Creek, British Columbia, Canada. The airport was listed as abandoned in the 15 March 2007 Canada Flight Supplement.

References

Defunct airports in British Columbia